The Castle Quarter may be:

Castle Quarter (Cardiff)
Castle Quarter (Buda)
Castle Quarter, Norwich: a shopping centre in Norwich